is a text adventure video game released for Japan's Family Computer.

Gameplay

Summary
A lot of strategy is used when players have to make decisions and negotiate. Messages always arrive using the data feed style to make the game more business-like. The game can end with a loss if the wrong decision is made at the wrong time (similar to dying in an action game). The player will have to deal with loan sharks in the Caribbean, ruthless corporate executives from rival companies, arbitration sessions, and components that make the game look more like a strategy game at times. There are no items to use and very little action (with moving the guy around a virtual office building).

Actions
 みる (見る) Look
 かんがえる (考える) Think
 はなす (話す) Talk
 のむ (飲む) Drink
 でんわ (電話) Telephone
 たいさく (対策) Analyze
 いけん (意見) Opinion
 こうしょう (交渉) Negotiate
 いどう (移動) Move

References

External links
 Business Wars Information 

1992 video games
Business simulation games
Japan-exclusive video games
Nintendo Entertainment System games
Nintendo Entertainment System-only games
Video games developed in Japan
Video games set in the 1980s